The International Union of Operating Engineers (IUOE) is a trade union within the United States-based AFL–CIO representing primarily construction workers who work as heavy equipment operators, mechanics, surveyors, and stationary engineers (also called operating engineers or power engineers) who maintain heating and other systems in buildings and industrial complexes, in the United States and Canada.

Founded in 1896, it currently represents roughly 400,000 workers in approximately 123 local unions and operates nearly 100 apprenticeship programs.

History 
In the late 1800s, working conditions were harsh for construction and stationary workers. Low wages, no benefits and 60–90 hour workweeks were the norm. In 1896, 11 individuals met in Chicago and formed the National Union of Steam Engineers of America, the forerunner to the IUOE. One year later, the organization began to admit Canadian members and changed its name to the International Union of Steam Engineers. By 1912, the organization changed its name again to the International Union of Steam and Operating Engineers.  In 1927, the union absorbed the International Brotherhood of Steam Shovel and Dredgemen.

The union dropped the word "steam" in 1928 as both the technology and the scope of labor had moved beyond steam technology. During the era of the two world wars and beyond, IUOE members were a significant part of the defense effort, from the Navy Seabees, who created the bases, airfields and roads, to the federal Highway Trust program, which created thousands of jobs for operating engineers. They also were part of many other important construction projects, including San Francisco’s Golden Gate Bridge, Chicago’s Sears Tower (renamed Willis Tower in 2009), Toronto’s CN Tower and Sky Dome (renamed Rogers Centre), New York’s Empire State Building and Holland Tunnel, the Statue of Liberty, Vancouver’s Lions Gate Bridge, the Alaskan pipeline, the Hoover Dam and countless others.

Training facilities 
IUOE locals and the IUOE national organization run training facilities throughout the country. The largest training facility, the International Training & Education Center (ITEC), is located in Crosby, Texas, and covers 265 acres. It was opened in July 2016.
The purpose of the ITEC is to provide hands-on training and education for union members in North America on new technologies and methodologies in construction such as excavation, drones, earthmoving, crane operation, mechanics, welding, and OSHA guidelines.

Technology and equipment providers such as Tadano America, Link-Belt Cranes, Terex Cranes, Manitowoc Cranes, Liebherr, Morrow Equipment, and Built Robotics donate, fund, or partner with the Union in providing access to different types of technology. These include cranes, virtual simulators, drones, autonomous equipment, welding bays, and heavy equipment. Additional industry partners include Lincoln Electric, Genie, DeWalt, Proto, Mac Tools, Lenox, John Deere, Caterpillar, Komatsu, and Simformotion.

Events 
On April 10, 2019, President Trump visited the IUOE Training and Education Center and issued two executive orders to change the process for how pipeline projects were approved, which aimed to simplify the process for oil and gas companies in the United States.

Local 3 
IUOE Local 3, based in Alameda, California, is the largest building and construction trades local in the U.S., with jurisdiction covering four states: California, Nevada, Hawaii and Utah. Most of Local 3's 42,600 members work as heavy equipment operators, and construction workers, but the local also represents public employees, such as maintenance workers and peace officers, Technical Engineers, Surveyors and Construction Inspectors as well as Building Inspectors.  Local 3 is headed by Business Manager Dan Reding.

Local 4 
IUOE Local 4, based in Medway, Massachusetts, has over 5,000 members in central and eastern Massachusetts (including Boston, Massachusetts), eastern New Hampshire, and Maine.

Local 14 
IUOE Local 14, based in Flushing, New York, represents approximately 1,600 members working in the five boroughs of New York City.

Local 15 
IUOE Local 15 (A-H), based in Long Island City, New York, represents about 5,000 operating engineers throughout the area of New York City - in tandem with IUOE Local 14. Local 15 is led by Business Manager and President Thomas A. Callahan, younger brother of IUOE General President James Callahan.

Local 17 
IUOE Local 17, based in Lake View, New York, represents 2,000 members throughout Western New York. Some of its membership derives from what was previously under the jurisdiction of IUOE Local 463, which was absorbed into Local 17 in May, 2019. IUOE Local 17 is led by Business Manager, Gary Swain and President, William (Bill) Fekete.

Local 49 
IUOE Local 49, based in Minneapolis, Minnesota, is the largest construction union in Minnesota and represents over 14,000 members across a broad range of industries including: Road, Highway and Bridge Construction, Building Construction, Housing Developments, River Dredging and Port Work, Oil and Natural Gas Pipeline Construction and Maintenance, Fiber Optic Installation and Repair, Mining, Logging, Sand and Gravel Pits, Asphalt and Concrete Plants, Wind and Solar Construction and Maintenance, Coal, Nuclear, Natural Gas Power Plants, Drilling, Equipment Rental/Maintenance Shops, City/County/School District Construction and Maintenance, and Water and Waste Water Plants. Local 49 has jurisdiction over Minnesota, North Dakota and South Dakota. Local 49's Business Manager is Jason George. 

The Local 49 Training Center located in Hinckley, Minnesota offers a comprehensive apprenticeship and educational program.

Local 49 has partnered with the Minnesota Virtual Academy to offer Operating Engineers pathway to high school students. Students participating in the pathway will take a series of classes that will prepare them to enter Local 49’s Operating Engineers Apprenticeship Program. Students will receive credit towards Local 49’s Apprenticeship Program based on courses completed.

Local 77 
IUOE Local 77 covers Washington, D.C., seven counties in Northern Virginia and four counties in Maryland surrounding the District of Columbia.

Local 98 
IUOE Local 98, based in East Longmeadow, Massachusetts, represents approximately 1,300 members in Western Massachusetts, Western New Hampshire, and Vermont.

Local 115 
Local 115, based in Burnaby, British Columbia Canada, represents over 12,000 skilled workers in construction, road building, transportation, mining, aviation and various industrial sectors throughout British Columbia and the Yukon. Local 115's Business Manager is Brian Cochrane and its President is Wayne Mills. Local 115 runs a Training Institute that is accredited with Private Career Training Institutions and delivers programs in accordance with British Columbia’s Industry Training Authority.

Temporary Foreign Worker legal challenge 
In 2013, IUOE Local 115, along with the BC Building Trades Union, had tried to overturn permits given to a Murray River coal mine near Tumbler Ridge, British Columbia to hire 201 Chinese temporary workers to work on a new mine owned by Chinese nationals. The unions claimed that the job ads were written to exclude Canadian workers, and instead chose to hire Chinese workers for lower wages rather than source or train local miners from the immediate area or the province.

However, a federal court judge disagreed. Russell Zinn found that HD Mining, the owner of the coal mine, had fulfilled the requirements set out in a federally mandated Labour Market Opinion (LMO) and dismissed the unions’ challenge. However, public and media attention on the case resulted in some changes being implemented into the Canadian Temporary Foreign Worker Program to ensure that foreign workers are not chosen over local resources, where available.

Local 137 
Local 137 represents the Operating Engineers in the counties of Westchester, Putnam and parts of Southern Dutchess. The branch is headquartered in Briarcliff Manor, New York, in a former dairy processing building for Briarcliff Farms.

Members of this branch are currently working on the largest infrastructure project in New York and one of the largest in the nation, the New Tappan Zee Bridge.

Local 139 
Local 139, based in Pewaukee, Wisconsin, represents over 9,500 members in Wisconsin. They represent workers employed across over 2,400 contractors.

Local 150
Local 150, based in Countryside, Illinois, is the second-largest local in the International (23,000 + Members) with jurisdiction in parts of three states: Illinois, Indiana and Iowa. Local 150's President and Business Manager is James "Jim" Sweeney. Local 150 represents the most traditional Operating Engineers (Hoisting and Portable,  Heavy-Highway, Building Trade, Quarry, Landfill, and Underground) employees in the International. Local 150 has an advanced Operating Engineers (Hoisting and Portable) apprenticeship program.

Local 501 – Southern California / Southern Nevada 
Local 501 was formed in 1953 by the merger of several regional locals and has offices in Los Angeles and Las Vegas. The Business Manager is Edward J. Curly. Members perform maintenance and repair of all HVAC equipment, boiler operation, lighting, plumbing, welding, painting, carpentry, or in general, all trade related maintenance and repair.

Local 825 
Local 825 covers New Jersey and the 'lower counties' (Rockland, Orange, Ulster, Sullivan & Delaware) of New York State. The Local 825 Business Manager is Greg Lalevee. The Local 825 training center is located adjacent to the NJ Turnpike.

Presidents
1896: Charles J. DeLong
1897: Frank Bowker
1898: Frank Pfohl
1898: Samuel L. Bennett
1899: Philip A. Peregrine
1900: Frank B. Monaghan
1901: George V. Lighthall
1903: Patrick McMahon
1904: John E. Bruner
1905: Matthew Comerford
1916: Milton Snellings
1921: Arthur M. Huddell
1931: John Possehl
1940: William E. Maloney
1958: Joseph J. Delaney
1962: Hunter P. Wharton
1976: James C. Turner
1985: Larry J. Dugan Jr.
1990: Frank Hanley
2005: Vincent J. Giblin
2011: James T. Callahan

Notable members
 Thomas P. Giblin (born 1947), New Jersey General Assembly member
 Robert Rita (born 1969), member of the Illinois House of Representatives
 Lee Savold (1915–1972), heavyweight boxer

References

External links

Local 115 BC & Yukon |http://www.iuoe115.com/

AFL–CIO
Canadian Labour Congress
Building and construction trade unions
Trade unions established in 1896
1896 establishments in Illinois